Chalin may refer to the following places in Poland:
Chalin, Kuyavian-Pomeranian Voivodeship (north-central Poland)
Chalin, Greater Poland Voivodeship (west-central Poland)

See also

Charlin (name)